Area code 606 is a telephone area code serving the eastern half of south-central and all of the eastern part of the Commonwealth of Kentucky. Cities and towns in the area code include Ashland, Morehead, Hazard, Middlesboro, Somerset, Stanford, London, Corbin, Greenup, Paintsville, Pikeville and Maysville. Most of its service area lies within the Kentucky region known as the Eastern Kentucky Coalfield.  It runs along the entire length of the state's borders with Virginia and West Virginia.

It was created in 1954 as a split from area code 502, and originally covered the entire eastern half of Kentucky, as far west as Lexington and Northern Kentucky (the Kentucky side of the Cincinnati area).  Notably, it was one of the first three area codes with "0" as the middle digit that were not assigned to an entire state; the others were area code 507 in Minnesota and area code 607 in New York.

In 1999, most of the northwestern portion of the old 606 territory, including Lexington and Northern Kentucky, split off as area code 859.  Conventional wisdom suggested that Lexington and Northern Kentucky should have kept 606.  Lexington was by far the largest city in the old area code. Combined, Lexington and Northern Kentucky accounted for almost two-thirds of the old 606's population. When an area code is split, normal practice calls for the largest city to retain the old area code. However, the rural portion of 606 is one of the poorest areas of the nation; 16 of the 100 poorest counties in the nation by median income are in 606.  The Kentucky Public Service Commission and BellSouth (now part of AT&T), the dominant carrier in the area at the time, decided to let the rural portion retain 606 in order to spare residents and businesses in this notoriously impoverished area the expense and burden of having to change their numbers, which would have also required en masse reprogramming of cell phones. Also, 859 on a standard telephone keypad can be translated into "UKY", a reference to the University of Kentucky, the state's flagship institution of higher learning, located in Lexington.

With the great majority of the old 606's landlines and cell phones transferring to 859, the split left 606 as one of the most thinly populated area codes in the country.  It is not currently projected to exhaust until about 2043.

Central office prefixes 

Note: This area code has a central office number assigned to Danville, (606-661) which is mostly served by the 859 area code.

References

External links

 Kentucky 606 area code overview

606
606
Telecommunications-related introductions in 1954